Qaṣabah Ma'ān is one of the districts  of Ma'an governorate, Jordan.

References 

Districts of Jordan